Alexander Robinson Delgado (born 21 November 1988) is a Costa Rican footballer who plays as a centre-back for Liga Nacional club Antigua.

Club career
Born in Tibás canton, San José Province, Robinson played youth football with Deportivo Saprissa, and made his debut with the senior team in 2008. The central defender suffered serious injuries in an automobile accident in 2010, but returned to captain the side. Robinson was originally left out of Saprissa's first team under new manager Daniel Casas, but would return in late 2012, scoring twice in a match against arch-rivals Alajuelense.

On 20 December 2013, he moved abroad for the first time of his career, signing with Brazilian third division side Esporte Clube Juventude.
 He returned to Saprissa in summer 2014.

Honours
Saprissa 
Liga FPD: Clausura 2008, Apertura 2010, Clausura 2014, Clausura 2018, Clausura 2020
Antigua
Liga Nacional de Guatemala: Apertura 2016
Comunicaciones 
CONCACAF League: 2021

References

External links
Deportivo Saprissa profile 

1988 births
Living people
People from San José Province
Costa Rican footballers
Association football defenders
Deportivo Saprissa players
Esporte Clube Juventude players
Costa Rican expatriate footballers
Expatriate footballers in Brazil
Municipal Grecia players